The Minister of Finance of Pakistan (Urdu: 'Wazīr-ē-Khazana') is a leading cabinet member who heads the Ministry of Finance in the Government of Pakistan. The Minister is responsible each year for presenting the federal government's budget to the Parliament of Pakistan. Ishaq Dar is currently serving as the Finance Minister since 28 September 2022.

List of Ministers

See also
 Constitution of Pakistan
 Defence Minister of Pakistan
 Foreign Minister of Pakistan
 Interior Minister of Pakistan
 President of Pakistan
 Prime Minister of Pakistan

References

External links
 Ministry of Finance, Government of Pakistan
 About the Minister of Finance
 Parliamentary Cabinet of Pakistan

Ministry of Finance (Pakistan)